Battle of Grodno may refer to:

 Battle of Grodno (1706), during the Great Northern War
 Battle of Grodno (1708), also during the Great Northern War
 First Battle of Grodno (1920), a Polish tank counter-attack during the Polish-Soviet War
 Battle of the Niemen River of 1920, sometimes referred to as the Second Battle of Grodno
 Battle of Grodno (1939), during the Soviet invasion of Poland, World War II